The 2016 Liga Premier, also known as the 100PLUS Liga Premier for sponsorship reasons, was the 13th season of the Liga Premier, the second-tier professional football league in Malaysia.

The season was held from 12 February and concluded on 22 October 2016.

The Liga Premier champions for 2016 season was Melaka United. The champions and runners-up were both promoted to 2017 Liga Super.

Teams

Team changes
The following teams have changed division since the 2015 season.

To Liga Premier
Promoted from Liga FAM
 Melaka United (champion)
 Perlis (runner-up)

Relegated from Liga Super
 ATM (11th place)
 Sime Darby (12th place)

From Liga Premier
Promoted to Liga Super
 Kedah (Defending champions)
 Penang (runner-up)
 T–Team (play-off winner)

Relegated to Liga FAM
 SPA (withdraw league)

Name changes 
 NS Matrix were renamed to Negeri Sembilan

Teams, locations and stadia

Personnel and sponsoring 

Note: Flags indicate national team as has been defined under FIFA eligibility rules. Players may hold more than one non-FIFA nationality.

Managerial changes 

Note: Flags indicate national team as has been defined under FIFA eligibility rules. Players may hold more than one non-FIFA nationality.

Foreign players 

Note: Players name in bold indicates the player is registered during the mid-season transfer window.

Results

League table

Result table

Positions by round

Crowd Attendance

For All Venues

By Week 

source:Sistem Pengurusan Maklumat Bolasepak

Season statistics

Top scorers

Hat-tricks 

Note
4 Player scored 4 goals

Own goals

Awards

Monthly awards

See also 
 2016 Liga Super
 2016 Liga FAM
 2016 Piala FA
 2016 Piala Malaysia
 2016 Piala Presiden
 2016 Piala Belia
 List of Malaysian football transfers 2016
 List of Malaysian football transfers summer 2016

References 

Malaysia Premier League seasons
2015–16 in Asian second tier association football leagues